The Governor of Ternopil Oblast is the head of executive branch for the Ternopil Oblast.

The office of Governor is an appointed position, with officeholders being appointed by the President of Ukraine, on recommendation from the Prime Minister of Ukraine, to serve a four-year term.

The official residence for the Governor is located in Ternopil. Since 19 March 2020 the Governor is Volodymyr Trush.

Governors
 Roman Hromiak (1992–1994, as the Presidential representative)
 Borys Kosenko (1994 as the Presidential representative)
 Borys Kosenko (1995–1996, as the Governor)
 Bohdan Boyko (1996–1998)
 Vasyl Vovk (1998–1999)
 Vasyl Kolomyichuk (1999–2002, acting to 1999)
 Ivan Kurnytskyi (2002–2004)
 Mykhailo Tsymbaliuk (2004–2005)
 Ivan Stoiko (2005–2007) 
 Yuriy Chyzhmar (2007–2010, acting to 2007)
 Yaroslav Sukhyi (2010) 
 Mykhailo Tsymbaliuk (2010) 
 Valentyn Khoptyan (2010–2014) 
 Oleh Syrotyuk (2014) 
 Ivan Krysak (2014–2015, acting) 
 Stepan Barna (2015–2019)
 Ivan Krysak (2019, acting)
 Ihor Sopel (2019–2020)
 Volodymyr Trush (2020-incumbent)

Notes

References

Sources
 World Statesmen.org

External links
Government of Ternopil Oblast in Ukrainian

 
Ternopil Oblast